The following is a timeline of the history of the city of Sana'a, Yemen.

Prior to 20th century

 530 CE - Abraha in power, with Sana'a as his capital (approximate date).
 570 - Siege of Sana'a (570); Sassanids in power.
 715 - Great Mosque of Sana'a building expanded.
 869 - Hiwali Yufirids in power (approximate date).
 901 - Town occupied by forces of Zaidi Yahya bin al-Husain.
 905 - Karmatian Ali bin al-Fadl in power.
 915 - Yufirid As'ad bin Ibrahim in power.
 956 - Town taken by Zaidi Mukhtar.
 1062 - Ali al-Sulayhi in power.
 1067 - Sulayhid capital relocated from Sana'a to Jibla by Arwa al-Sulayhi (approximate date).
 1221 - Rasulid Badr al-Din Hasan in power.
 1259 - Earthquake.
 1538 - Ottomans in power.
 1602 - Ottomans ousted.
 1872 - Ottomans in power; Sana'a becomes capital of the Yemen Vilayet.
 1887 - Population: 25,000 (estimate).
 1891
 Uprising against Turkish rule.
 Population: 50,000 (estimate).

20th century

 1902 - Dar as-Sanay built.
 1905 - Uprising against Turkish rule.
 1911 - Political unrest.
 1918 - Turkish rule ends.
 1921 - Population: 25,000 (approximate estimate).
 1948
 17 February: Imam Yahya assassinated.
 Alwaziri coup.
 1952 - Al-Ahli Club Sana'a (football club) formed.
 1954 - Al-Wehda Club (football club) formed.
 1956 - Population: 60,000 (estimate).
 1962
 September: Military coup; 
 City becomes capital of the Yemen Arab Republic.
 Al-Thawra newspaper begins publication.
 1967 - November: Siege of Sana'a (1967) begins.
 1970 - Sana'a University established.
 1971 - National Museum of Yemen established in Dar al-Shukr.
 1974 - June: Military coup; Ibrahim al-Hamdi in power.
 1975
 Installation of water supply system begins.
 Population: 140,339 (estimate).
 1981 - 280,000.
 1982 -  established.
 1983 - Sana'a University Museum built.
 1984 - Military Museum and General Organisation for the Preservation of Old Sana'a established.
 1986
 Ali Mohsen Al-Muraisi Stadium and Althawra Sports City Stadium open.
 Old City designated an UNESCO World Heritage Site.
 Population: 427,505.
 1987 - Sultan Palace Hotel in business.
 1988 - Women's Technical School built.
 1990
 City becomes capital of the Republic of Yemen.
 Central Bank of Yemen headquartered in city.
 1991 - Yemen Times newspaper begins publication.
 1994 - Population: 973,548.
 1995 - San'a Institute for the Arabic Language established.
 1996 - Yemen Observer  newspaper begins publication.

21st century

2000s
 2004 - House of Folklore museum established.
 2008
 Saleh Mosque built.
 17 September: 2008 attack on the American Embassy in Yemen.
 November: Political demonstration.
 Al-Oruba football club formed.
 2009 - Population: 1,976,286.

2010s

 2011
 23 May-7 June: Battle of Sana'a (2011) (first phase).
 18 September-25 November: Battle of Sana'a (2011) (second phase).
 2011 Yemeni protests.
 2012 - 21 May: 2012 Sana'a bombing.
 2014
 16–21 September: Battle of Sana'a (2014).
 21 September: 2014–15 Yemeni coup d'état begins.
 9 October: Bombing in Tahrir Square.
 2015
 January 2015 Sana'a bombing
 20 January: Houthis take Presidential Palace.
 20 March: 2015 Sana'a mosque bombings.
 April: Airstrike.
 2016
 2016–17 Yemen cholera outbreak begins.
 Yemen Supreme Political Council headquartered in city.

See also
 Sana'a history
 Timeline of Yemeni history
 Timelines of other cities in Yemen: Aden

References

This article incorporates information from the Arabic Wikipedia.

Bibliography

Published in 18th-19th centuries
 
 
 

Published in 20th century
 
 
 
 R.B. Serjeant and R. Lewcock, eds., San'a: An Arabian-Islamic City (London: World of Islam Festival Trust, 1983).
 R. Lewcock, The Old Walled City of San'a (Paris: UNESCO, 1986)
 
 
 
 
 

Published in 21st century

External links

 Map of San'a, 1946
 
 
 Europeana. Items related to Sana'a, various dates.
  (Television documentary filmed in Sana'a in 2015, and also in Saada, Jaʿār, Rada'a, Aden)

 
Sana'a
Sanaa
Years in Yemen
Sana'a